Sidney Harth (5 October 1925 in Cleveland – 15 February 2011 in Pittsburgh) was an American violinist and conductor.

Education
Harth was born in Cleveland, Ohio. He graduated from the Cleveland Institute of Music and studied with Joseph Knitzer, Mishel Boris Piastro and George Enescu. Subsequently, he held faculty positions at University of Louisville, the University of Houston, the University of Texas, Yale University, and the Mannes College of Music.

Career
He made his European debut touring France with pianist Theodore Lettvin in 1951–1952 in a concert series organized by the National Music League and the Jeunesses Musicales International. Harth performed with major orchestras across the world, and made numerous recordings with the Chicago Symphony Orchestra and the Kraków Radio and Television Orchestra.

He was Concertmaster of the New York Philharmonic Orchestra and Chicago Symphony Orchestra, Principal Concertmaster and Associate Conductor of the Los Angeles Philharmonic Orchestra, and Concertmaster and Assistant Conductor of the Louisville Orchestra. 
An acclaimed conductor, Harth was during his career Principal Conductor of the Natal Philharmonic Orchestra in South Africa, and musical director of the Jerusalem Symphony Orchestra, Northwest Chamber Orchestra of Seattle and the Puerto Rico Symphony Orchestra.

Academia
Harth was at one time a faculty member of the Yale School of Music.  He also was Head of the School of Music at Carnegie Mellon University, where he also taught violin and chamber music. Until the time of his death on 15 February 2011, Harth was the Director of Orchestral Activities at Duquesne University Mary Pappert School of Music.

Awards
In 1957 Harth became the first American to receive the Laureate Prize in the Wieniawski Violin Competition held in Poland.

He was initiated as an honorary member of the Zeta Kappa chapter of Phi Mu Alpha Sinfonia fraternity, the national fraternity for men in music, in 1958 and was selected as a National Honorary member of the fraternity in 1966.

Personal life
He married Teresa Testa, a professional Violinist whose appointments included positions with the Louisville Orchestra, the Chicago Lyric Opera, the Los Angeles Philharmonic, and The Principal Second Violin Chair of the Pittsburgh Symphony Orchestra.  Married for over sixty years, the couple had two children.  Their daughter Laura is a Music Producer and Recording Executive, and their late son Robert was the executive and artistic director of Carnegie Hall.

References

External links

1925 births
2011 deaths
American classical violinists
Male classical violinists
American male violinists
American male conductors (music)
Concertmasters
Henryk Wieniawski Violin Competition prize-winners
Musicians from Cleveland
University of Houston faculty
20th-century classical violinists
Cleveland Institute of Music alumni
Classical musicians from Ohio
20th-century American conductors (music)
20th-century American male musicians
20th-century American violinists